Dmitri Proshin may refer to:
 Dmitri Proshin (footballer, born 1974), Russian footballer with FC Torpedo Vladimir
 Dmitri Proshin (footballer, born 1984), Russian footballer with FC Pskov-747 Pskov